Adolph John "Otto" Rettig (January 29, 1894 – June 16, 1977) was a Major League Baseball pitcher who played in  with the Philadelphia Athletics. He started four games, going 1-2 with a 4.91 ERA, walking 12 batters. He pitched 18⅓ innings.

He was part of the selected group of Major League Players to play at Wahconah Park.

External links

1894 births
1977 deaths
Major League Baseball pitchers
Baseball players from New York (state)
Philadelphia Athletics players
Lewiston Cupids players
Seton Hall Pirates baseball players